Thevar Jayanthi, celebrated on 30 October, is an annual commemoration of the birthday of Pasumpon Muthuramalingam Thevar. It is celebrated in a grand way by the Thevar community in the southern districts of Tamil Nadu. Although not an official public holiday, many schools and businesses in the area remain closed on the day.

Thevar's legacy
Whilst having been active in politics, it is mainly the spiritual discourse of Thevar that explains his following after his death. Also, the fact that his date of birth and death lie some close to each other has been interpreted as a sign of supernatural powers.

Thevar Shrine
One of the main events on Thevar Jayanthi takes place at the samadhi (burial place) of Pasumpon Muthuramalingam Thevar, located at some 50 miles distance from Madurai. Pilgrims gather to take part in the ceremonies at the samadhi on 30 October. In later years the ceremony at the samadhi has begun to attract prominent politicians.

Political controversy
The All India Forward Bloc, the political party to which Pasumpon Muthuramalingam Thevar belonged, has demanded that Thevar Jayanthi be declared a public holiday in Tamil Nadu.

The event is not entirely uncontroversial. The CPI(ML) Liberation has charged that the Tamil Nadu government should stop sponsoring Thevar Jayanthi celebrations, claiming that the event is utilized by casteist forces.

2007 centenary celebrations
On 30 October 2007, the birth centenary of Pasumpon Muthuramalingam Thevar was celebrated. Tamil Nadu Chief Minister M. Karunanidhi took part in the celebrations in Pasumpon village. This was the first time in two decades that Karunanidhi participated in Thevar Jayanthi. At the celebrations, Karunanidhi suggested that Madurai Airport be renamed after Pasumpon Muthuramalingam Thevar. These moves were seen as an attempt by Karunanidhi's Dravida Munnetra Kazhagam (DMK) party to challenge the supremacy of the rival All India Anna Dravida Munnetra Kazhagam (AIADMK) over the Thevar community. The AIADMK leader J. Jayalalitha criticized Karunanidhi's participation in the Thevar Jayanthi centenary program, stating that he did not believe in Thevar's ideas. Moreover, she claimed that her previous government had allocated 30 million rupees for the Thevar Jayanthi centenary, but that Karunanidhi's government had spent only five million rupees.

References

Annual events
Unofficial observances
Politics of Tamil Nadu
October observances